The Ministry of Justice is a ministerial department of the Government of France, also known in French as . It is headed by the Minister of Justice, also known as the Keeper of the Seals, a member of the Council of Ministers. The ministry's headquarters are on Place Vendôme, Paris.

Organization
 Minister of Justice: The current Minister of Justice is Éric Dupond-Moretti since July 2020.
 The Judicial Services Directorate ( (known as DSJ) is responsible for the civil courts. The DSJ contributes to the drafting of texts and provides its opinion on laws being drafted and regulations that regards the courts.
 The Civil Affairs and Seals Directorate ( (DACS)
 The Criminal Matters and Pardons Directorate (DACG) contributes to drafting criminal justice texts that lay down the rules for proceedings, judgment, and enforcement of rulings and oversees their application.
 The Prison Administration Directorate a.k.a. French Prison Service ( (DAP, "Prisons Administration Directorate") ensures the execution of judicial decisions concerning persons who are the subject of a judicial measure restricting or depriving of liberty.
 The Judicial Youth Protection Directorate ( (DPJJ) is responsible, within the framework of the competence of the Ministry of Justice, for all questions concerning juvenile justice.
 The Inspectorate-General of the Judicial Services ( (IGSJ) is in charge of inspecting the departments within the Ministry and he courts (exception the Court of Cassation).
 The General Secretariat assists the minister in the administration of the ministry and provides support to the departments of the ministry.

List of ministers

See also
 Justice ministry
 Minister of Justice (France)
 Prison conditions in France

Notes

References

External links
 Ministry of Justice 
 Living in Detention – Handbook for New Inmates – French Prison Service 

 
Justice
France
France
1790 establishments in France